In the mathematical field of graph theory, an induced subgraph of a graph is another graph, formed from a subset of the vertices of the graph and all of the edges (from the original graph) connecting pairs of vertices in that subset.

Definition
The same definition works for undirected graphs, directed graphs, and even multigraphs.

Examples
Important types of induced subgraphs include the following.

Induced paths are induced subgraphs that are paths. The shortest path between any two vertices in an unweighted graph is always an induced path, because any additional edges between pairs of vertices that could cause it to be not induced would also cause it to be not shortest. Conversely, in distance-hereditary graphs, every induced path is a shortest path.
Induced cycles are induced subgraphs that are cycles. The girth of a graph is defined by the length of its shortest cycle, which is always an induced cycle. According to the strong perfect graph theorem, induced cycles and their complements play a critical role in the characterization of perfect graphs.
Cliques and independent sets are induced subgraphs that are respectively complete graphs or edgeless graphs.
Induced matchings are induced subgraphs that are matchings.
The neighborhood of a vertex is the induced subgraph of all vertices adjacent to it.

Computation
The induced subgraph isomorphism problem is a form of the subgraph isomorphism problem in which the goal is to test whether one graph can be found as an induced subgraph of another. Because it includes the clique problem as a special case, it is NP-complete.

References

Graph operations
Graph theory objects